is a village and community in the north of Cardiff, Wales, north of the M4 motorway in the Taff Valley. It is notable as the location of the hillside landmark, . The population as of the 2011 census was 1871.

Toponymy
 is believed to have obtained its name from the word  meaning 'ley land', i.e. (See also Tonna.)

Overview 
 lies in the River Taff Valley. Its population was 1946 at the 2001 census.

 is located near Junction 32 of the M4 motorway, east of Bridgend and west of Newport and the A470 trunk road.

Many consider  as the entrance to the South Wales Valleys from Cardiff, with its famous landmark, on a hillside. The main route to the Valleys, and beyond to Mid Wales, the A470, runs alongside the village. To the north of the village is Fforest Fawr, a forest of about   run by the Natural Resources Wales.  is separated from the rest of Cardiff by the M4 and the A470 to the south and west and hills and forestry to the east.  is considered to be part of the Cardiff North Rural Area.

 is home to a pub, several shops, a football club, a rugby club, a 9-hole golf course, and  Library.

The Taff Trail cycle route passes through the village, and it is a popular resting point between sections.

The Cardiff Railway once ran through . It passed through a tunnel just beneath . Tongwynlais railway station opened in 1911 and closed in 1931.  The nearest station on the Coryton Line is Coryton railway station. Radyr railway station is also nearby.

Government 
Senedd Cymru – Welsh Parliament

Houses of Parliament
Cardiff North is currently represented by Anna McMorrin MP, a member of the Labour Party.

Local Government - City Council
 is part of the Whitchurch & Tongwynlais electoral ward of Cardiff City Council and is represented by 4 councillors all of the Welsh Labour Party. In addition,  is also governed by a community council.

Local Government - Community Council
Elections are held every five years. The last election was held at the same time as the 2022 Cardiff Council election. The next election is due to be held in May 2027.

Castell Coch 

' most notable building is the Victorian era folly castle called  (Red Castle) which is open to the public.
It was rebuilt and transformed in the late 1870s by William Burges for the 3rd Marquess of Bute.

Places of worship 
There is a parish church and two Nonconformist chapels still open to worshippers in the village:
St Michael and All Angels (Church in Wales) (built 1875–77)
Ainon Baptist Church (built 1832)
Bethesda United Reformed Church (built 1861)

There were once two other chapels in the village (both Nonconformist), which have since closed and been converted into private residences.

Music 
The band RocketGoldStar wrote a song about the village, recording it on their 1996 album. They recorded it for a BBC Radio 1 Maida Vale Session.  Brass Band has been in existence since the 19th century and continues to compete in national competitions as well as performing concerts.  Choral Society also does a lot of charitable work and has recently performed in the Czech Republic.

The Welsh glam metal band Tigertailz named a song on Disc 1 of their Thrill Pistol album " Fly".

Images

References 

Hutton, J. An Illustrated History of Cardiff Docks. Volume 3: The Cardiff Railway Company and the docks at war. Silver Link 2009

External links 
 GENUKI page
 www.geograph.co.uk : photos of Tongwynlais and surrounding area
 tongwynlais.org Community Council website
 tongwynlais.com Independent hyperlocal website
 

Communities in Cardiff
Villages in Cardiff